Mariana Díaz may refer to:
Mariana Díaz Oliva (born 1976), Argentine retired tennis player
Mariana Diaz Ximenez (born 1983), East Timorese marathon runner
Mariana Díaz Leal (born 1990), Mexican footballer

See also
Mariano Díaz (disambiguation)